John McNeil (1813-1891) was Union army officer.

John McNeil may also refer to:
 John McNeil Jr. (1784–1850), U.S. Army officer
 John Winfield Scott McNeil (1817–1837), U.S. Army officer
 John McNeil (musician) (born 1948), American jazz trumpeter
 John McNeil (footballer, born 1959), Scottish footballer (Morton)
 Johnny McNeil, Scottish football player and manager (Bury, Torquay United)

See also
John McNeill (disambiguation)
John MacNeill (disambiguation)
Ian Niall (1916–2002), pen name of Scottish writer John McNeillie